St. Stephen's Methodist Church is a historic Methodist church located in the Marble Hill neighborhood of Bronx, New York City.  The church was designed by architect Alexander McMillan Welch and built in 1897. It is a two-story, Shingle style church on a raised basement.  It has a cross-gable roof topped by a small cupola, a rose window on the front facade, and features a pronounced bell tower with an open belfry and balconies.  The interior is based on the Akron Plan.  The church has an attached Sunday School wing with a hipped roof.  Also on the property is the contributing two-story, Queen Anne style frame parsonage.

It was added to the National Register of Historic Places in 2012.

References

External links
 American Guild of Organists website

Churches completed in 1897
United Methodist churches in New York City
Properties of religious function on the National Register of Historic Places in the Bronx
Shingle Style architecture in New York City
Queen Anne architecture in New York City
Marble Hill, Manhattan